Chikkagunjal is a village in Dharwad district of Karnataka, India.

Demographics 
As of the 2011 Census of India there were 334 households in Chikkagunjal and a total population of 1,510 consisting of 788 males and 722 females. There were 125 children ages 0-6.

References

Villages in Dharwad district